During World War II, Operation Speedwell was an early Special Air Service raid against Italian rail targets near Genoa starting on 7 September 1943. The fourteen-man group split into a number of smaller units to destroy track and ambush trains. The surviving raiders returned to friendly lines by foot after up to seven months behind enemy lines, some after time in captivity.

References

Conflicts in 1943
World War II British Commando raids